A Bearded Man is a study by Peter Paul Rubens, now held in the Museo Soumaya in Mexico City.

History
It was attributed to Rubens by Max Friedländer, Valentiner Held and Jaffé, who date it to between 1617 and 1618 from indications that it was produced in his Wapper studio-house in Antwerp.

At that time Rubens' only assistant was Anthony van Dyck.

Construction site 
This work, which is a study, was attributed to Rubens by Max Friedländer, Valentiner Held and Jaffé. These authors indicate that it was painted between 1617 and 1618, which indicates that it was carried out in the house-studio in Wapper Street, Antwerp. In this time and place Anton Van Dyck used to attend this studio to assimilate the secrets and technique of Rubens.

References

1618 paintings
Paintings by Peter Paul Rubens
Paintings in the collection of the Museo Soumaya